Heretics of Dune is a 1984 science fiction novel by Frank Herbert, the fifth in his Dune series of six novels. It was ranked as the No. 13 hardcover fiction best seller of 1984 by The New York Times. 

Fifteen hundred years have passed since the 3,500-year reign of the God Emperor Leto II Atreides ended with his assassination; humanity is firmly on the Golden Path, Leto's plan to save humanity from destruction.  By crushing the aspirations of humans for over three thousand years, Leto caused the Scattering, an explosion of humanity into the rest of the universe upon his death.  Now, some of those who went out into the universe are coming back, bent on conquest. Only the Bene Gesserit perceive the Golden Path and are therefore faced with a choice: keep to their traditional role of hidden manipulators who quietly ease tensions and guide human progress while struggling for their own survival, or embrace the Golden Path and push humanity onward into a new future where humans are free from the threat of extinction.

Plot 
Much has changed in the millennium and a half since the death of the God Emperor. Sandworms have reappeared on Arrakis (now called Rakis), each containing a fragment of the God Emperor's consciousness, and have renewed the flow of the all-important spice melange to the galaxy. With Leto's death, the complex economic system built on spice collapsed, resulting in a period of famine followed by trillions of people leaving known space in a great Scattering. 

A new civilization has risen, with three dominant powers: the Ixians, whose no-ships are capable of piloting between the stars and are invisible to outside detection; the Bene Tleilax, who have learned to manufacture spice in their axlotl tanks and have created a new breed of Face Dancers; and the Bene Gesserit, a matriarchal order of subtle political manipulators who possess superhuman abilities. However, people from the Scattering are returning with their own peculiar powers. The most powerful of these forces are the Honored Matres, a violent society of women bred and trained for combat and the sexual control of men.

On Rakis, a girl who can control the giant worms called Sheeana (later revealed to be a descendant of Siona from the previous novel) has been discovered. The Bene Gesserit intends to use a Tleilaxu-provided Duncan Idaho ghola to gain control of this sandrider, and the religious forces of humanity who they know will ultimately worship her. The Tleilaxu have altered the ghola to bring its physical reflexes up to modern standards. The Bene Gesserit leader, Mother Superior Taraza, brings Miles Teg (also descended from Siona) to guard the new Idaho. Taraza also sends Reverend Mother Darwi Odrade to take command of the Bene Gesserit keep on Rakis. Odrade is a loose cannon; she does not obey normal Bene Gesserit prohibitions about love, and is also Teg's biological daughter. 

Bene Gesserit Imprinter Lucilla (yet another descendant of Siona's) is also sent by Taraza to bind Idaho's loyalty to the Sisterhood with her sexual talents. However, Lucilla must deal with Reverend Mother Schwangyu, head of the ghola project but also the leader of a faction within the Bene Gesserit who feel the gholas are a danger. Above the planet Gammu (formerly known as Giedi Prime), Taraza is captured and held hostage by the Honored Matres aboard an Ixian no-ship. The Honored Matres insist Taraza invite Teg to the ship, hoping to gain control of the ghola project. Teg manages to turn the tables on the Matres, and rescues the Mother Superior and her party. 

An attack is then made on Sheeana on Rakis, which is prevented by the intervention of the Bene Gesserit. Odrade starts training Sheeana as a Bene Gesserit. At about the same time an attempt is made on the life of Idaho, but Teg is able to defeat it. Teg flees with Duncan and Lucilla into the countryside. In an ancient Harkonnen no-globe, Teg proceeds to awaken Idaho's original memories, but does so before Lucilla can imprint Duncan and thus tie him to the Sisterhood. 

In the meantime, Taraza has sent her trusted general Burzmali to search for Teg and his party, who finally establishes contact with Teg, his former mentor. During the operation, however, Teg and his companions are ambushed. Teg is captured while Lucilla and Duncan escape. Teg is tortured by a T-Probe, but under pressure discovers new abilities: drastically increased physical capabilities and an uncertain type of prescience, which he uses to easily escape. At the same time, Idaho is ambushed and taken hostage. Taraza arranges a meeting with the Tleilaxu Master Waff, who is soon forced to tell her what he knows about the Honored Matres. When pressed on the issue of Idaho, he also admits that the Bene Tleilax have conditioned their own agenda into him. 

As the meeting draws to a close, Taraza accidentally divines that Waff is a Zensunni, giving the Bene Gesserit a lever to understand their ancient competitor. She and Odrade meet Waff again on Rakis. He tries to assassinate Taraza but Odrade convinces him that the Sisterhood shares the religious beliefs of the Bene Tleilax. Taraza offers full alliance with them against the onslaught of forces out of the Scattering. This agreement causes consternation among the Bene Gesserit, but Odrade realizes that Taraza's plan is to destroy Rakis. By destroying the planet, the Bene Gesserit would be dependent on the Tleilaxu for the spice, ensuring an alliance. 

Lucilla arrives at a Bene Gesserit safe house to discover it has been taken over by a young Honored Matre named Murbella, who has partially subdued Idaho.  After being defeated in a quick bout of personal combat, Murbella assumes that Lucilla is the Great Honored Matre, and allows Lucilla and Burzmali to watch through the window of a locked room while she completes the sexual enslavement of the ghola.   However, hidden Tleilaxu conditioning kicks in, and Duncan responds with an equal technique, one that overwhelms Murbella; the experience restores in him the entire memories from all of the hundreds of previous Idaho gholas. Stunned and exhausted, Murbella dimly realizes that the man is the ghola they had been warned to search for, and unlocks the door to the room to gain Lucilla's assistance in killing him.  But Lucilla says, "We will kill no one.  This ghola goes to Rakis."

The Honored Matres attack Rakis, killing Taraza. Odrade becomes temporary leader of the Bene Gesserit before escaping with Sheeana into the desert on a worm. Teg also goes to a supposed safe house, only to discover the Honored Matres. He unleashes himself upon the complex, and finds that his prescient powers allow him to 'see' shielded no-ships; he captures one and locates Duncan and Lucilla. They are taken to Rakis with him and the now-hostage Murbella. When they arrive, Teg intercepts Odrade and Sheeana and their giant worm, having seen Taraza's master plan with his new vision. He loads them all up in his no-ship, finally leading his troops out on a last suicidal defense of Rakis, designed to attract the rage of the Honored Matres. 

The Honored Matres attack Rakis, destroying the planet and the sandworms  except for the one the Bene Gesserit escape with. They intend to drown the worm in a mixture of water and spice, turning it into sandtrout which will turn the secret Bene Gesserit planet Chapterhouse into another Dune, but with the collective consciousness of the God Emperor diluted into just one sandworm, freeing humanity from the shadow of his prescience forever.

Publication history 
Frank Herbert wrote much of the initial draft of Heretics of Dune in Hawaii, using a Compaq word processor. According to his son Brian, Herbert's time spent writing the draft would be "exceedingly arduous and much slower for him [Herbert] than usual, because of all the time he had to spend out of his study tending to the medical crises of my mother, Beverly Herbert."

Reception
Heretics of Dune was ranked as the No. 13 hardcover fiction best seller of 1984 by The New York Times.

References

1984 American novels
1984 science fiction novels
Dune (franchise) novels
Sequel novels
G. P. Putnam's Sons books
Novels by Frank Herbert
Novels set on fictional planets
Works about women in war